Naserabad (also Romanized as Nāṣerābād; also known as Naz̧arābād) is a village in Palangabad Rural District, Palangabad District, Eshtehard County, Alborz Province, Iran. At the 2006 census, its population was 78, in 25 families.

References 

Populated places in Eshtehard County